Ernst Bernhard Lohrmann (30 June 1803 — 17 June 1870) was a German-Finnish architect born and educated in Germany but practising mainly in the Grand Duchy of Finland, where he is known especially as a designer of public buildings and more than 20 churches, many in the late Empire and Gothic Revival styles.

Lohrmann also held the position of Intendant of the National Board of Public Building, following the death in 1840 of his predecessor and compatriot Carl Ludvig Engel. In that role, Lohrmann is credited with considerably developing and systematising the Board's operations, as well as seeing through to completion many of Engel's unfinished designs.

Notable examples of buildings designed by Lohrmann include:
St. Henry's Cathedral, Helsinki
Mint of Finland, Helsinki
Kuopio Governor Palace (original plans, not built)
Utsjoki Church
Ruokolahti Church
Söderskär Lighthouse, Porvoo
Old Turku Prison ('Kakola')
Villa Hakasalmi, Helsinki
Kristinestad City Hall
Pielisjoki Castle, Joensuu

References

Ernst Lohrmann
Architects from North Rhine-Westphalia
Finnish architects
19th-century German architects
University of Göttingen alumni
1803 births
1870 deaths